The following elections occurred in the year 1889.

 1889 Christchurch North by-election
 1889 Liberian general election
 1889 New York state election
 1889 Newfoundland general election

Europe
 1889 Dalmatian parliamentary election
 1889 French legislative election
 1889 Portuguese legislative election
 1888–1889 Serbian parliamentary election

United Kingdom
 1889 Govan by-election

See also
 :Category:1889 elections

1889
Elections